Matilde Palou was a Mexican film actress. She appeared in thirty films during her career.

Selected filmography
 Juarez and Maximillian (1934)
 Narciso's Hard Luck (1940)
 The Eternal Secret (1942)
 Susana (1951)
 El derecho de nacer (1952)
 Cradle Song (1953)
 La intrusa (1954)

References

Bibliography
 Hershfield, Joanne. Mexican Cinema/Mexican Woman, 1940-1950.  University of Arizona Press, 1996.

External links

Year of birth missing
Year of death missing
Mexican film actresses
20th-century Mexican actresses